The AIC Serie A Football Club of the Year (in Italian: Società dell'anno AIC) is an annual award given to football club in the top tier of Italian football, the Serie A, who is considered to have performed the best during the previous calendar season. It is awarded within the Gran Galà del Calcio event.

The award has been presented since the 2010–11 season. The shortlist is compiled by the members of the players' trade union, the Italian Footballers' Association (AIC).

Winners

By club

References

Serie A trophies and awards
Oscar del Calcio
Awards established in 2011